The men's basketball tournament at the 2008 Summer Olympics in Beijing, began on 10 August and ended on 24 August, when the United States defeated Spain 118–107 for the gold medal. All games were held at the Beijing Olympic Basketball Gymnasium.

Qualification

Format
 Twelve teams are split into 2 preliminary round groups of 6 teams each. The top 4 teams from each group qualify for the knockout stage.
 Fifth-placed teams from each group are ranked 9th–10th by basis of their records.
 Sixth-placed teams from each group are ranked 11th–12th by basis of their records.
 In the quarterfinals, the matchups are as follows: A1 vs. B4, A2 vs. B3, A3 vs. B2 and A4 vs. B1.
The eliminated teams at the quarterfinals are ranked 5th–8th by basis of their preliminary round records
 The winning teams from the quarterfinals meet in the semifinals as follows: A1/B4 vs. A3/B2 and A2/B3 vs. A4/B1.
 The winning teams from the semifinals play for the gold medal. The losing teams play for the bronze.

Ties are broken via the following the criteria, with the first option used first, all the way down to the last option:
 Head to head results
 Goal average (not the goal difference) between the tied teams
 Goal average of the tied teams for all teams in its group

All times are local Beijing Time (UTC+8).

Squads

Preliminary round
All times are China Standard Time (UTC+8)

Group A

Group B

Knockout round

Quarterfinals

Semifinals

Bronze medal match

Gold medal match

The Americans got off to a start with the Spaniards hitting seven of their first nine shots; if not for a 10–0 run by LeBron James and Dwyane Wade, the Americans would have trailed in the first quarter. With USA leading by 14, Spain chipped away at the lead during the second quarter to cut the deficit to eight points.

The team traded baskets in the third quarter, with Spain cutting the deficit further to seven. A three-point field goal by Rudy Fernández cut the lead into two, the smallest deficit with 8:13 left in the fourth. Kobe Bryant and Wade extended the lead with three-pointers to 103–92 but Spain had a final push, capped with another three-pointer from Carlos Jiménez to reduce the lead 108–104. In the final 2 minutes a three-pointer by Dwyane Wade and a Kobe Bryant field goal extended the lead back to 9. It is widely regarded as one of the greatest basketball games ever played.

Awards

Statistical leaders
Top ten in points, rebounds and assists, and top 5 in steals and blocks.

Points

Rebounds

Assists

Steals

Blocks

Game highs

Final standings

Rankings are determined by:
1st–4th
Results of gold and bronze medal games.
5th–8th:
Win–loss record in the preliminary round group
Standings in the preliminary round group (i.e. Group A's #3 is ranked higher than Group B's #4.)
Goal average in the preliminary round group
9th–10th and 11th–12th:
5th placers in the preliminary round groups are classified 9th–10th; 6th placers classified *11th–12th
Win–loss record in the preliminary round group
Goal average in the preliminary round group

See also
 Women's Tournament

References

External links
Men's tournament official website

 
Basketball at the 2008 Summer Olympics
Basketball at the Summer Olympics – Men's tournament